Euller Elias de Carvalho  (born March 15, 1971) is a Brazilian retired football player at the position of striker. Throughout his career, he was nicknamed "The Son of the Wind" (in Portuguese: "O Filho do Vento") for his amazing pace.

Euller played for several clubs in the Campeonato Brasileiro, including América-MG, São Paulo, Atlético Mineiro, Palmeiras, Vasco da Gama and São Caetano.

Euller also spent two seasons playing for Kashima Antlers in the J1 League.

Career statistics

Club
Source:

International

Honours
América-MG
Minas Gerais State Championship: 1993
Brazilian Série C: 2009

São Paulo
Recopa Sudamericana: 1994

Atlético Mineiro
Minas Gerais State Championship: 1995

Palmeiras
Copa Libertadores: 1999
Rio-São Paulo Tournament: 2000

Vasco da Gama
Mercosur Cup: 2000
Brazilian Série A: 2000

Kashima Antlers
J. League Cup: 2002
A3 Champions Cup: 2003

São Caetano
São Paulo State Championship: 2004

References

External links

 CBF 

Living people
1971 births
Association football forwards
Brazilian footballers
Brazilian expatriate footballers
Sportspeople from Minas Gerais
Brazil international footballers
São Paulo FC players
Clube Atlético Mineiro players
Sociedade Esportiva Palmeiras players
Tokyo Verdy players
CR Vasco da Gama players
Kashima Antlers players
Associação Desportiva São Caetano players
América Futebol Clube (MG) players
Tupynambás Futebol Clube players
Expatriate footballers in Japan
J1 League players
Campeonato Brasileiro Série A players